Jyoti Kumari (born ) is an Indian student from Sirhulli in the rural Darbhanga district of Bihar. She was given a national award, and a Bollywood film was proposed to record her story.

Life
Kumari was born around 2005, and is from a small village named Sirhulli in the Darbhanga district in Bihar. Her mother, Phoolo Devi, is a cook in an Anganwadi child care facility, and her father was an e-rickshaw driver.

On 25 March 2020, India imposed a lockdown to try to contain the COVID-19 pandemic. This resulted in tens of millions of out-of-work migrant workers deciding that they should journey home where they had the support networks required to look after them. Among these was Kumari's father, a rickshaw driver, but he had damaged his leg in an accident and was unable to walk. India's government had imposed different restrictions for different areas, but nationwide restrictions included travel restrictions and no interstate bus journeys. They were a long way from their homes and Kumari proposed to cycle home. With their last money they bought a girl's bicycle and despite Kumari's father's doubts they set off on 8 May 2020.     

Spectators were surprised to find a large man sitting on the seat of a bicycle while his much smaller daughter did the pedalling. They did have a short lift in a lorry, but they travelled about 100 miles each day.

This act of bravery was praised by the Senior Advisor to the President of the United States, Ivanka Trump, and Prime Minister Narendra Modi. Other well wishers and VIPs were outside her house when the story was published. The crowd was criticised for not following India's social distancing rules whilst giving her gifts.

Even though there were several promises to help her attend school, Jyoti has still not been admitted into any secondary or higher secondary school.

Kumari was conferred the 2021 Pradhan Mantri Rashtriya Bal Shakti Puraskar for bravery in the times of pandemic by the President of India. Jyoti was invited to appear for cycling trials at the All India Cycling Federation because she was a plausible selection for the Indian cycling team. The New York Times, in reports on Jyoti, referred to her as the "lionhearted girl… inspiring a nation".

Film proposal 
It was reported by India Today that Jyoti would play the lead role for a proposed Bollywood movie on her journey with her ailing father back home. The journey would be from Gurugram to Darbhanga, but it would also include fictionalised incidents to develop the story.

References 

2000s births
Living people
Students in India
People from Gurgaon
Indian female cyclists